Corbicula largillierti is a species of mollusc belonging to the family Cyrenidae.

Synonym:
 Cyrena largillierti Philippi, 1844 (= basionym)

References

Cyrenidae